Frederick Thomas Trouton FRS (24 November 1863 – 21 September 1922) was an Irish physicist known for Trouton's rule and experiments to detect the Earth's motion through the luminiferous aether.

Life and work 
Trouton was born in Dublin on 24 November 1863, the youngest son of the wealthy and prominent Thomas Trouton. He attended Royal School Dungannon and went on to Trinity College, Dublin in 1884, where he studied engineering and physical science. While still an undergraduate student, Trouton observed a relationship between boiling points and energies of vaporisations, which he presented in two short papers. He found the change of entropy per mole for vaporisation at a boiling point is constant, or expressed mathematically ΔSm,vap = 10.5 R (where R is the ideal gas constant). This became known as Trouton's rule and, despite having some exceptions, is used to estimate the enthalpy of vaporisation of liquids whose boiling points are known. Trouton himself belittled his discovery as it was merely the result of an afternoon's manipulation of data from a book of tables. Before graduating he also took a leading role in surveying for a railway.

Trouton graduated Master of Arts and Doctor of Science in 1884, and was immediately appointed assistant to the professor of experimental physics, George Francis FitzGerald. They collaborated on many experiments and became good friends; FitzGerald's influence can be seen in much of Trouton's early work.

Trouton was elected a Fellow of the Royal Society in June 1897. His application citation read: "Discovered the law connecting the latent heat of vaporisation and molecular weights of bodies known as "Trouton's law" and experimentally determined the directions of vibration of electric and inaquatic force in plane polarised light. He has made other important observations on the phase of secondary waves and on the influence of the size of the reflector in Hertz's equipment."

A 1902 appointment as Quain Professor of Physics at University College London led to a 12-year career of experimental physics, including work on the Trouton-Rankine experiment. He received an OBE in 1918.

Trouton married Anne Maria Fowler in 1887 and they had four sons and three daughters. Their first two sons, Eric and Desmond, were killed in World War I. He became severely ill in 1912 and an operation in 1914 left him paralysed in the lower limbs and caused his retirement. Despite this, he retained the wit and charm he was known for. After retiring, Trouton lived in Tilford, Surrey, and then Downe in Kent where he died on 21 September 1922.

References

Irish physicists
1863 births
1922 deaths
Alumni of Trinity College Dublin
Scientists from Dublin (city)
People educated at the Royal School Dungannon
Fellows of the Royal Society
Academics of University College London